Birger Maertens (born 28 June 1980) is a Belgian former professional footballer who played as a centre back. He obtained two caps for the Belgium national team.

Club career

Club Brugge
Born in Bruges, Maertens joined Club Brugge KV in 1994. He played his first game on 9 August 2001 against Icelandic side IA Akranes (4–0) in the UEFA Cup.

Heracles Almelo
On 25 June 2008, Maertens joined the Dutch side Heracles Almelo. He signed a contract until 2011. 
In 2009 Birger Maertens was voted 8th best overall player in the Eredivisie by Dutch football magazine Voetbal International.

On 6 January 2012, it was announced he had left Heracles earlier than planned, due to personal reasons, to return to his native Belgium, and would not see out the rest of his contract.

International career
On 12 October 2005, Maertens collected his first cap for the Belgium national team in the qualification stages for the 2006 FIFA World Cup against Lithuania (1–1).

Honours
Club Brugge
Belgian First Division: 2002–03, 2004–05
Belgian Cup: 2001–02, 2003–04, 2006–07
Belgian Super Cup: 2002, 2003, 2004, 2005

References

External links
 
 

1980 births
Living people
Footballers from Bruges
Belgian footballers
Association football defenders
Belgium youth international footballers
Belgium under-21 international footballers
Belgium international footballers
Club Brugge KV players
Heracles Almelo players
K.V.C. Westerlo players
Belgian Pro League players
Challenger Pro League players
Eredivisie players
Belgian expatriate footballers
Expatriate footballers in the Netherlands
Belgian expatriate sportspeople in the Netherlands